The Shire of Traralgon was a local government area about  east-southeast of Melbourne, the state capital of Victoria, Australia. From 1961 onwards, it did not actually administer the town of Traralgon, which was the responsibility of a separate authority.

History

Traralgon was incorporated as a shire on 24 October 1879. On 27 May 1892, it lost its Western Riding, which formed the Shire of Morwell. The town of Traralgon was incorporated separately as a borough on 31 May 1961, becoming the City of Traralgon three years later.

On 2 December 1994, the Shire of Traralgon was abolished, and along with the Cities of Moe, Morwell and Traralgon, and parts of the Shires of Narracan and Rosedale, was merged into the newly created City of Latrobe.

Ridings

The Shire of Traralgon was divided into two ridings, each of which elected three councillors:
 Central Riding
 East Riding

Towns and localities
 Callignee
 Flynns Creek
 Koornalla
 Loy Yang
 Traralgon South
 Traralgon West
 Tyers

Population

* Estimate in the 1958 Victorian Year Book.

References

External links
 Victorian Places - Traralgon Shire

Traralgon
1879 establishments in Australia
1994 disestablishments in Australia